Dictya umbrarum  is a species of fly in the family Sciomyzidae. It is found in the  Palearctic and Nearctic.
Dictya montana is a predator of aquatic pulmonate snails with no apparent parasitoid tendency.

References

External links
Images representing Dictya umbrarum  at BOLD

Sciomyzidae
Flies described in 1758
Diptera of Europe
Taxa named by Carl Linnaeus